Mary Ann R Tadd (born 1936), is a female former athlete who competed for England.

Athletics career
She represented England in the javelin at the 1958 British Empire and Commonwealth Games in Cardiff, Wales.

References

1936 births
English female javelin throwers
Athletes (track and field) at the 1958 British Empire and Commonwealth Games
Living people
Commonwealth Games competitors for England